Adelphia Louis Bissonette (September 6, 1899 – June 9, 1972) was an American professional baseball player, coach and manager. After his playing career Bissonette continued to work in professional baseball as a coach and manager.

Playing career
Born in Winthrop, Maine, Bissonette attended Kents Hill School, Westbrook Seminary, the University of New Hampshire and Georgetown University before signing a professional baseball contract with Valleyfield–Cap de la Madeleine in the Class B Eastern Canada League in 1922. A left-handed batting and throwing first baseman, Bissonette was an outstanding hitter, batting .381 for York of the Class A New York–Penn League in 1925. In 1927, playing for the Buffalo Bisons, Bissonette led the top-level International League in runs (168), hits (229), doubles (46), triples (20), home runs (31), and runs batted in (167). His .367 batting average was nine points behind the IL's batting champion that season.

The following season, Bissonette joined the Brooklyn Robins — the once and future Dodgers — of the National League and continued his lusty hitting, batting .320 with 25 home runs in 155 games. In one game on April 21, 1930 Bissonette became the first known player in Major League history to hit a bases-loaded triple and a bases-loaded home run (a grand slam) in the same game, a rare feat matched only by a handful of players since. But 1930 was his last productive season as a Major League player. He suffered a tendon injury, missed the entire  season with an illness, and was back in the International League by the middle of the  campaign. In 604 MLB games played, overall or parts of five seasons with Brooklyn, Bissonette batted .305 with 66 homers and 391 RBI.

Manager and coach
Bissonette turned to managing in the minor leagues in 1937 and by 1942 he had joined the Boston Braves farm system as pilot of their Class A Hartford Chiefs affiliate in the Eastern League. When Hartford won 99 games and the 1944 EL regular season pennant, Bissonette was promoted to a coaching job with Boston. After 93 games, with the  Braves faltering and in seventh place in the National League, manager Bob Coleman was fired July 31 and Bissonette took the helm for the remainder of the season.

By 1947, Bissonette was back in the minor leagues as a manager with the Portland Pilots of the Class B New England League. He rose as high as the Triple-A Toronto Maple Leafs in 1949, but never managed again in the Majors.

References

 J. G. Taylor Spink, ed. The Baseball Register, 1946 edition. St. Louis: Charles C. Spink and Son.
 The Deadball Era

1899 births
1972 suicides
Albany Senators players
Baltimore Orioles (IL) players
Baseball coaches from Maine
Baseball players from Maine
Binghamton Triplets players
Bradford Bees players
Brooklyn Dodgers players
Brooklyn Robins players
Boston Braves coaches
Boston Braves managers
Buffalo Bisons (minor league) players
Des Moines Demons players
Georgetown Hoyas baseball players
Georgetown University alumni
Glace Bay Miners players
Hartford Bees players
Jersey City Skeeters players
Kents Hill School alumni
Major League Baseball first basemen
Montreal Royals players
New Hampshire Wildcats baseball players
People from Winthrop, Maine
Pittsburgh Pirates coaches
Quebec Athletics players
Rochester Tribe players
Suicides by firearm in Maine
Toronto Maple Leafs (International League) managers
Toronto Maple Leafs (International League) players
Westbrook College alumni
York White Roses players
Valleyfield/Cap-de-la-Madeleine Madcaps players
American expatriate baseball players in Canada